Terowie railway station was located on the Roseworthy–Peterborough line in the South Australian town of Terowie.

History
Terowie station opened in 1880 when the broad gauge line from Adelaide was completed. In 1881, it became a junction station when the narrow gauge line from Peterborough opened. This resulted in Terowie becoming an important transshipment point on the South Australian Railways network.

The opening of the Trans-Australian Railway in 1917 further increased the amount of traffic, this ceased operating via Terowie in 1937 when the Adelaide to Redhill line was extended to Port Pirie.

With the opening of the Leigh Creek Coalfield in the 1940s, the volume of freight transhipped increased again. This ceased with the opening of the Stirling North to Marree line on 27 July 1957. As part of the conversion of the Port Augusta to Broken Hill line to standard gauge, the line north of Terowie to Peterborough was converted to broad gauge on 12 January 1970, thus making Peterborough the break of gauge point.

Terowie was reduced to a crossing loop with the line closing on 26 July 1988.

General Douglas MacArthur monument

While changing trains in Terowie on 20 March 1942, United States General Douglas MacArthur was interviewed by two journalists from the Adelaide Advertiser newspaper regarding the Battle of the Philippines. He said: "The President of the United States ordered me to break through the Japanese lines and proceed from Corregidor to Australia for the purpose, as I understand it, of organising an American offensive against Japan, the primary purpose of which is the relief of the Philippines. I came through and I shall return". The following morning the Advertiser printed the interview with MacArthur under the headline: "I Shall Return." MacArthur used the phrase repeatedly in his press releases until his return to Manila in February 1945. The event is commemorated by a plaque on the platform (which misquotes his remark).

See also
Naval Base Adelaide

References

External links

Flickr gallery
Johnny's Pages gallery

Disused railway stations in South Australia
Railway stations in Australia opened in 1880
Railway stations closed in 1988
South Australian Heritage Register